Michael Affarano (born June 9, 1962) is an American professional stock car racing driver and race team owner. As a driver, he last competed part-time in the NASCAR Gander RV & Outdoors Truck Series for his own team, Mike Affarano Motorsports. He has also competed and fielded a team in the ARCA Racing Series.

Racing career

ARCA Menards Series and 2012 Talladega crash
Affarano made his first attempt in ARCA in 2012 at the season opener at Daytona driving the No. 59 for Mark Gibson, but he did not qualify for the race. He began fielding his own team in the series starting at Talladega. In his first race as an owner-driver, he became known for a crash in that race where his No. 83 flipped on lap 76 of the race. Since the car landed on its roof, a safety truck had to flip it back on its wheels, where Affarano proceeded to climb out of his car with the help of safety personnel at the scene.

Affarano drove in four more races that year, with two being for his own team and the other two driving the No. 18 for Fast Track Racing.

Affarano nor his team did not end up making up any starts in 2013, however, plans were announced for him to drive the No. 40 Dodge for Carter 2 Motorsports at Chicago, but Dominick Casola ended up driving the car instead. Casola originally had been announced to be in the other C2M car, the No. 97, which was driven by Nick Tucker instead.

He returned with his own team, now using the No. 03, for two attempts in 2014. The first was a withdrawal at his home track of Chicago, and the second being at Pocono where he surprisingly finished 14th in a field of 31 cars.

In 2015, Affarano did not drive in any races himself, but he did have Raymond Hassler in the No. 03 at Daytona and Kevin Rutherford in the car for three races at Nashville, Toledo, and Winchester.

NASCAR Gander RV & Outdoors Truck Series
Affarano's first truck start came at the 2014 Eldora race. He fielded his own truck, the No. 03 Chevrolet, and qualified into the event through his heat race. However, in the race, Affarano finished last. He made three more starts that year at Chicago, Bristol (which was a DNQ), and Talladega.

He returned in 2015, again for a part-time schedule. Affarano himself drove at Kansas, Texas, Gateway, and Iowa. He also withdrew from two other races that year at Dover and Kentucky. He did enter his truck at Eldora for the second year in a row, but this time, it was with Jake Griffin driving. It was the first time he had someone other than himself driving his truck. After that Tim Viens attempted Pocono and Michigan for the team but failed to qualify in both. After that Viens and Affarano Motorsports were supposedly to attempt Chicago's race but withdrew.

Affarano and his No. 03 team did not attempt any races in 2016, but they did attempt to come back in 2017 at Talladega. They were initially on the entry list, but the team withdrew after they could not get the truck ready and updated in time, according to a post on the team's Facebook page.

He also withdrew from the race at Chicago in 2018. John Provenzano attempted Eldora's race for the team but failed to qualify.

In 2019, Jake Griffin returned to the team for Eldora's race and finished 26th.

NASCAR Xfinity Series 
In 2015, Affarano expanded his race team into the NASCAR Xfinity Series, attempting one race with Johanna Long in his No. 03 car, but failed to qualify. After that, Long parted ways with the team. Affarano did not run any Xfinity races as a driver, though. 

The team was planning to debut at the season-opener at Daytona in February 2015, but they had to postpone their debut due to lack of sponsorship. Affarano started his Xfinity team by purchasing cars and equipment from the closed Turner Scott Motorsports team.

Personal life
Affarano lives in Shorewood, Illinois where he owns an auto parts shop. He is happily married for many years. He lost his 16-year old son, named after him, in May 2005. He also has two other children, twin boys, (born 2007), who are also into racing.

Motorsports career results

NASCAR

Camping World Truck Series

 Season still in progress
 Ineligible for series points

ARCA Racing Series

References

External links
 
 

1962 births
Living people
People from Shorewood, Illinois
Racing drivers from Illinois
NASCAR drivers
ARCA Menards Series drivers